Comparisons is a Canadian documentary television series which aired on CBC Television from 1959 to 1963.

Premise
The National Film Board of Canada produced these documentaries which compared Canadian society with that of other nations.

Scheduling
This 30- to 60-minute series was broadcast sporadically from 9 January 1959 to 1 July 1963. It was rebroadcast Thursdays at 6:30 p.m. (Eastern) from 14 July to 25 August 1966.

Episodes
The series included the following films, the year of which indicates the NFB production date:

 Age of Dissent: Young Men With Opinions (1959)
 Britain and Canada Debate Britain's World Leadership (1959)
 Courtship (1961)
 Four Families (1959)
 Four Religions (1960)
 Four Teachers (1961)
 Of Sport And Men (1961)
 Suburban Living: Six Solutions (1960)

References

External links
 
 Comparisons at the National Film Board of Canada

CBC Television original programming
1959 Canadian television series debuts
1963 Canadian television series endings
Black-and-white Canadian television shows
National Film Board of Canada documentary series
1950s Canadian documentary television series
1960s Canadian documentary television series